Willy Jürissen (13 May 1912 – 30 October 1990) was a German international footballer. He was part of Germany's squad at the 1936 Summer Olympics, but he did not play in any matches.

References

1912 births
1990 deaths
Association football goalkeepers
German footballers
Germany international footballers
Rot-Weiß Oberhausen players
Luftwaffen-SV Hamburg players